Marcelo Tavares may refer to:
 Marcelo Tavares (footballer)
 Marcelo Tavares (entrepreneur), Brazilian videogames collector